Gukan (also Romanized as Gūkān, Gaūkūn, and Gowkān; also known as Gūkān-e ‘Olyā) is a village in Ashayer Rural District, in the Central District of Fereydunshahr County, Isfahan Province, Iran. At the 2006 census, its population was 59 people, distributed across 11 families.

References 

Populated places in Fereydunshahr County